Thedi Vanda Lakshmi is a 1973 Tamil-language action drama film, directed by G. R. Nathan and produced by Modern Theatres. The film stars Jaishankar and Lakshmi.

Plot

Lakshmi's (Lakshmi) brother Rathnam is murdered and cops interrogate her about 2 million Rupees which the murdered man has looted. A shocked and dismayed Lakshmi is pounded on one side by the accomplices of Ratnam and on another by the cops pressuring her to return the stolen booty to them.

While Lakshmi doesn't know anything about the money, she seeks solace in the arms of Ramesh (Jaishankar). The lovers join forces to find the missing stash of cash and prove her innocence.

Cast
 Jaishankar as Inspector Mohan Kumar / Ramesh / Kannan
 Lakshmi as Lakshmi
 R. S. Manohar as Jamboo
 Major Sundarrajan as C.I.D. Chandrasekhar / Raja Pandiyan
 S. V. Ramadoss as Johnny
 Thengai Srinivasan as Kuberan
 Manorama as Geetha
 Vennira Aadai Moorthy as Inspector
 Kannan as Kaali
A. Sakunthala
 Jayakumari as Pattuma
 'Baby' Rajee

Soundtrack
The music was composed by M. S. Sanjay.

References

External links

1973 films
1970s Tamil-language films